Trudi Sudan Carter (born 18 November 1994) is a Jamaican professional footballer who plays as a forward for Spanish Liga F club FC Levante Las Planas and the Jamaica women's national team.

College career
Carter attended and played football at the University of South Florida.

Club career
In 2018, Carter signed with AS Roma women's team

International career
Carter plays for the Jamaica women's senior national team.

International goals
Scores and results list Jamaica's goal tally first

References

External links

1994 births
Living people
Sportspeople from Kingston, Jamaica
Jamaican women's footballers
Women's association football forwards
Women's association football midfielders
Navarro Bulldogs soccer players
South Florida Bulls women's soccer players
A.S. Roma (women) players
Gintra Universitetas players
FC Levante Las Planas players
Serie A (women's football) players
Primera División (women) players
Jamaica women's international footballers
2019 FIFA Women's World Cup players
Jamaican expatriate women's footballers
Jamaican expatriate sportspeople in the United States
Expatriate women's soccer players in the United States
Jamaican expatriate sportspeople in Italy
Expatriate women's footballers in Italy
Jamaican expatriate sportspeople in Lithuania
Expatriate women's footballers in Lithuania
Jamaican expatriate sportspeople in Spain
Expatriate women's footballers in Spain